Kipner is a surname. Notable people with the surname include:

Nat Kipner (1924–2009), American songwriter and record producer, father of Steve
Steve Kipner (born 1950), American-born Australian songwriter and record producer

See also
Kepner
Kipper (disambiguation)